Wang Tau Hom is an area in mid-north New Kowloon of Hong Kong. A public housing estate, Wang Tau Hom Estate, is situated in the area. Administratively, it is part of Wong Tai Sin District.

The area is regarded as part of Lok Fu due to the nearby MTR station.

Education
Wang Tau Hom is in Primary One Admission (POA) School Net 43. Within the school net are multiple aided schools (operated independently but funded with government money) and Wong Tai Sin Government Primary School.

References 

 
Areas of Hong Kong
Wong Tai Sin District
New Kowloon